The Blair Tobacco Storage Warehouse Complex Historic District encompasses a complex of tobacco storage and processing facilities at 2601 Maury Street in Richmond, Virginia.  Included in the  site are 26 large warehouses, and a number of ancillary buildings.  The complex exhibits a historical range of trends in the processing and storage of tobacco, dating from its inception in 1939 into the 1980s.  The Blair Storage Company was founded in 1939 by Joseph Blair, the son of a dry goods dealer, who had diversified into the transport of tobacco and other goods before opening the storage facility.

The complex was listed on the National Register of Historic Places in 2016.

See also
National Register of Historic Places listings in Richmond, Virginia

References

Historic districts in Virginia
Industrial buildings and structures on the National Register of Historic Places in Virginia
Industrial buildings completed in 1939
Buildings and structures in Richmond, Virginia
National Register of Historic Places in Richmond, Virginia
Warehouses on the National Register of Historic Places
Tobacco buildings in the United States